The Regional Municipality of Ottawa–Carleton was a Regional Municipality and Census Division in Ontario, Canada, that existed between January 1, 1969, and January 1, 2001, and was primarily centred on the City of Ottawa. It was created in 1969 by restructuring Carleton County and annexing Cumberland Township from the United Counties of Prescott and Russell into the newly created Region of Ottawa–Carleton.

It was the second Regional Municipality to be created in Ontario after the Municipality of Metropolitan Toronto. It served as an upper-tier level of municipal government, aggregating municipal services on a region-wide basis like the Counties and Regional Municipalities of Southern Ontario, and was the only upper-tier municipal government ever created in Eastern Ontario. The Regional Municipality was dissolved upon the creation of the amalgamated City of Ottawa on January 1, 2001.

Constituent Municipalities
The Regional Municipality originally consisted of the Cities of Ottawa and Eastview, the Villages of Rockcliffe Park, Richmond and Stittsville, and the Townships of Torbolton, Fitzroy, Huntley, March, Goulbourn, Nepean, Osgoode, Marlborough, North Gower, Gloucester and Cumberland.  At the same time as the creation of the Region, the City of Eastview was renamed the City of Vanier.

Chronology
In 1974
The police villages of City View, Kenmore, Manotick, Metcalfe, North Gower, Osgoode Station, and St. Joseph d'Orleans were dissolved.
Goulbourn Township annexed the villages of Richmond and Stittsville.
The townships of Marlborough and North Gower merged to become Rideau Township.
At the same time the Townships of Torbolton, Fitzroy and Huntley merged to become West Carleton Township.
In 1978
The township of March and parts of Goulbourn and Nepean townships became the city of Kanata.
At the same time the township of Nepean became the city of Nepean.
In 1981 the township of Gloucester became the city of Gloucester.
In 1999 the township of Cumberland became the city of Cumberland.

Purpose of Regional Government
The Region, known as an "upper-tier" level of municipal government, was created to manage municipal services that crossed municipal boundaries and were more efficiently provided to residents on a regional, as opposed to local, basis. Over time, more and more services were transferred from the "lower-tier" municipalities to the Region and, by the end of the 1990s, 85% of municipal services were delivered by the Region. This included mass transit, policing, arterial roads, sewage, water, social services, garbage collection and Regional planning. Periodical reorganization (e.g. rural townships acquiring city status, as in 1974 and 1978) did not impede the process.

However the constituent municipalities of the RMOC were unified in a single City of Ottawa in 2001 by the Fewer Municipal Politicians Act of Ontario (1999), by the government of Premier Mike Harris, re-elected promising a "Common Sense Revolution." Several other Ontario conurbations were also unified under the Act, listed at. Ottawa thus became in sheer area one of the largest municipalities in Canada, roughly 65 kilometres by 32, much of this farmland, although 90 per cent of the population live in urban concentrations.

On formation in 1969, the RMOC was a Council of members selected by the municipal councils, who elected among themselves a Regional Chairman. In 1991, the Regional chairman was for the first time directly elected by the people of the Region, which municipal mayors earlier resisted, fearing the chairman would effectively become a "super mayor". In 1994, Regional councillors were directly elected to represent Regional wards, rather than being appointed from the lower-tier municipal councils. Many of the new Regional wards crossed municipal boundaries, which in the eyes of many local residents undermined local or historical differences. Generally in Ontario regional government reforms of the 1990s were sometimes mistrusted as preparation for eventual creation of unified "mega-cities", but this was not before 1999 a topic of local political anxiety in Ottawa-Carleton, (see discussion in.)

Regional Chairs

See Regional Chair of Ottawa-Carleton.

External links

1969 establishments in Ontario
2001 disestablishments in Ontario
Ottawa
Former municipalities now in Ottawa
Populated places disestablished in 2001